The 2013 Swiss Indoors was a men's tennis tournament played on indoor hard courts. It was the 44th edition of the event known as the Swiss Indoors, and part of the 500 series of the 2013 ATP World Tour. It was held at the St. Jakobshalle in Basel, Switzerland, from 21 October through 27 October 2013. First-seeded Juan Martín del Potro won the singles title.

Points and prize money

Point distribution

Prize money

Singles main-draw entrants

Seeds

 Rankings are as of October 14, 2013

Other entrants
The following players received wildcards into the singles main draw:
  Marco Chiudinelli
  Alexandr Dolgopolov
  Henri Laaksonen

The following players received entry from the qualifying draw:
  Benjamin Becker 
  Tobias Kamke 
  Denis Kudla
  Paul-Henri Mathieu

Withdrawals
  Brian Baker
  Nikolay Davydenko
  Federico Delbonis (personal reasons)
  Marinko Matosevic
  Rafael Nadal (fatigue)
  Milos Raonic (personal reasons)

Retirements
  Carlos Berlocq (right foot pain)

Doubles main-draw entrants

Seeds

 Rankings are as of October 14, 2013

Other entrants
The following pairs received wildcards into the doubles main draw:
  Marco Chiudinelli /  Michael Lammer
  Sandro Ehrat /  Henri Laaksonen

Finals

Singles

 Juan Martín del Potro defeated  Roger Federer, 7–6(7–3), 2–6, 6–4

Doubles

  Treat Huey /  Dominic Inglot defeated  Julian Knowle /  Oliver Marach, 6–3, 3–6, [10–4]

References

External links
Official website

2013 ATP World Tour
2013
2013 in Swiss tennis